Buln Buln railway station was a railway station on the Noojee railway line. It was located in the town of Buln Buln. It was opened in 1890 and closed in 1958. In 1977 the station was acquired and turned into a recreational reserve.

References 

Disused railway stations in Victoria (Australia)
Railway stations in Australia opened in 1890
Transport in Gippsland (region)
Shire of Baw Baw